Jyo Achyutananda is a 2016 Indian Telugu-language comedy drama film directed by Srinivas Avasarala and produced by Sai Korrapati on Varahi Chalana Chitram. It stars Nara Rohit, Naga Shourya and Regina Cassandra. The plot follows two brothers–Achyuth (Rohit) and Ananda (Shaurya) who fall in love with their neighbour Jyo (Cassandra).

The film began its production in December 2015, and released worldwide on 9 September 2016.

Plot

Achyuta Rama Rao (Nara Rohit) "Achyuth" and Ananda Vardhan Rao (Naga Shaurya) "Anand" are brothers. One is an HRM and the other is a medical representative. Because of their ego problems, both brothers are not having good relations with each other, but in front of others, they act as caring brothers. Once a treat is given by Achyuth for buying a new car, with Anand's money they argue at the restaurant and talk about one Jyo and are caught by their respective wives. After the dinner when at home their wives ask them about Jyo simultaneously, they cover up with lies saying their brother was in love with Jyo, and blame each other. After that incident, both brothers meet at night in the portico of their home. They remember their past, Jyothsna Kumari, a.k.a. Jyo (Regina Cassandra) is a dental student who rents their penthouse with her father Surya Narayana Murthi, a.k.a. Sudoku Murthi (Tanikella Bharani).

Both brothers fall in love with Jyo and start being friends with her. Anand wants to propose to her on his birthday and writes a letter to her. Achyuth tries to read the letter secretly and gets caught by Anand. He encourages him to propose and when he tries to give her the letter, she says that Achyuth has already proposed to her in the morning with a love letter and she cannot say yes to him because she is in love with someone else. She requests Anand to convince Achyuth to drop out. Thinking that Jyo loves him, Anand quarrels with Achyuth. Finally, the brothers decide to ask her who she loves. In that meeting, she says she is in love with Juvvala Bala Bharadwaj (Shashank), who is another dental student going to the US and she is also planning further studies in the US with him. In this incident angered Achyuth burns Jyo's passport which is revealed by Anand to Jyo, this makes her angry at both the brothers and she complains to their father. Before she could complain he gets a severe heart attack and is admitted to ICU. Thinking that Jyo is the reason behind their father's heart attack, both brothers threaten to kill her if their father dies. After that incident, Jyo confesses everything the brothers have done to her with her father. Then he manages the situation and sends her to the US. After that Achyuth and Anand's father dies in the hospital.

After five years at present, they were in their respective lives, and their hatred increased. Meanwhile, Sudoku Murthi announces that Jyo is coming back to India after completing her studies. when Jyo returns home she observes the situation in their house and she decides to set it right. On the marriage anniversary of Achyuth, Jyo encourages them to show their talents in front of their wives. But knowing the reality that their talents are opposite to what they have said to their wives, like Achyuth is a good painter, but he portrayed himself as a tennis player, and vice versa with Anand. Then the brothers manage their wives with comical circumstances and convince them. In the process, they both think on the positive side of the other but their egos will not accept to start fresh. Then one-night Jyo calls Achyuth to bring the tablets for a migraine, and when he does, Jyo suddenly proposes to him. shocked, Achyuth, because of the sudden events tries to convince her in the dark restaurant with the help of Anand. Meanwhile, with the influence of their husbands, their wives unknowingly show grief to each other.

Finally, both brothers decide on her engagement with Anand's brother-in-law. At the engagement function, she denied the ring and confesses that she is in love with someone. she says that he is now a married guy when they started loving he was not married and he promised her that he will give divorce his wife and she says she will wait for him and breaks off the engagement. The same night both brothers were discussing the incident and found out that Jyo also played the same trick on Anand. Finally, they realize that they were tricked by Jyo and get furious. They go to Jyo's room and demand an explanation from her. She says that she wanted to take revenge. Then the brothers apologize about that incident and plead for her to forget everything about what they have done to her. Then she says that when she was in the US she broke up with Bharadwaj because of his possessiveness and started to move on with her life, then Bharadwaj blackmails her with the love letters and gifts which she had given to him. Then she blackmails them to get back the love letters and gifts that she had given to Bharadwaj, if not she will give the love letters to their wives which they had written to her. Then Achyuth pressures Anand to take the love letters from him, but Anand does not show any interest in his proposal. The angry Achyuth sells Anand's book Chivariki Migiledi which is gifted by his father to Anand on his birthday.

Angered, Anand calls a builder to reconstruct their independent house into apartments. knowing this Achyuth quarrels again with Anand then their mother intervenes and successfully convinces Achyuth of the project. The brothers decide to work together for the last time for Jyo's sake and went to Bharadwaj's house. Achyuth makes a plan to take the items from Bharadwaj. But the idea backfired when Bharadwaj caught both brothers red-handed. Then in a fight, Achyuth escaped successfully from the house, and Anand was caught by Bharadwaj with the bundles and gifts of Jyo. Anand was beaten by Bharadwaj, but Achyuth could not come to the rescue, instead, he sees it like a movie. Finally in a hard struggle Anand also successfully escapes with the things of Jyo from Bharadwaj. After that incident, the brothers quarrel again. Anand asks Achyuth since he is a brother to him, why did he not come to the rescue. Then Achyuth gives a selfish reply to Anand. Then Anand was heartbroken and decides to shift to Bangalore. After that incident, even Achyuth was ashamed of his act. Then he breaks his ego and decides to set it aside. Then he goes to Bharadwaj's house and bashes him. Then he went with Anand to the railway station for a sendoff. Then Jyo tells them that Bharadwaj called her to compromise and say thanks to the brothers and went off after hearing from Jyo Anand asked Achyuth if he beat Bharadwaj. Then he says yes, Anand becomes emotional due to the sudden change in Achyuth's behavior.

Achyuth presents the book Chivariki Migiledi to Anand with their father's signature. Then Anand recognized the book is not their father's because the signature of the father is different. Then Achyuth apologizes to Anand for his foolish actions and pleads to forget everything and come back as his younger brother. He also says that he failed as an elder brother but they may not fail as brothers. Then Anand accepted his apologies and welcomed him to their father's position and decides to take the book he had left on the train. In distance was watching by Jyo with her fiance (Nani). She says to him that she is indirectly responsible for that situation after meeting with their mom she decided to make unite together and at the same time, she wants to solve her problem. She says that they both have affection for each other she just realized it on them. Finally, the film ends with the brothers catching the running train to take the book which has gifted Achyuth to Anand.

Cast
Nara Rohit as Ainapurapu Achyuta "Achyuth" Rama Rao
Naga Shourya as Ainapurapu Ananda "Anand" Vardhan Rao 
Regina Cassandra as Boggaram Jyotsna "Jyo" Kumari 
Tanikella Bharani as Boggaram Surya Narayana Murthi "Sudoku Murthi"
 Pavani Gangi Reddy as Kalpana Achyuth's wife
Rajeshwari Pamidighantam as Priya Anand's wife
Ashok Kumar as Ainapurapu Koteswara Rao Achyuth and Anand's father
Seetha as Achyuth and Anand's mother
Shashank as Juvvala Bala Bharadwaj.  
Chaitanya Krishna as Anand's brother-in-law.
Mirchi Hemanth as Achyuth's employee. 
Sanjay Reddy as Jyotsna's cousin
Nani as Jyo's new boyfriend (cameo)

Soundtrack

The film's songs and background music are composed by Kalyan Koduri and all the lyrics are penned by Bhaskara Bhatla. This was the second collaboration between Koduri and Avasarala Srinivas after Oohalu Gusagusalade.

References 

2016 films
Vaaraahi Chalana Chitram films
2010s Telugu-language films